Perna  is a genus of  mussels, marine bivalve molluscs in the family Mytilidae.

Not to be confused with Perna Bruguière, 1789 , synonym of Isognomon Lightfoot, 1786

Species
Species within the genus Perna  include:

 Perna canaliculus (Gmelin, 1791)  New Zealand green-lipped mussel
 Perna perna (Linnaeus, 1758)
 † Perna tetleyi (Powell & Bartrum, 1929) 
 Perna viridis: Asian green mussel (Linnaeus, 1758)

Species brought into synonymy:
 Perna africana (Chemnitz, 1785): synonym of Perna perna (Linnaeus, 1758)
 Perna confusa Angas, 1871: synonym of Limnoperna securis (Lamarck, 1819)
 Perna fulgida H. Adams, 1870: synonym of Lioberus ligneus (Reeve, 1858)
 Perna indica Kuriakose & Nair, 1976: synonym of Perna perna (Linnaeus, 1758)
 Perna magellanica Philipsson, 1788: synonym of Perna perna (Linnaeus, 1758)
 Perna picta (Born, 1778): synonym of Perna perna (Linnaeus, 1758)  
 Perna plumescens Dunker, 1868: synonym of Modiolus plumescens (Dunker, 1868)
 Perna ungulina Philipsson, 1788: synonym of Mytilus edulis Linnaeus, 1758
 Perna variabilis (Krauss, 1848): synonym of Brachidontes pharaonis (P. Fischer, 1870)

References

Further reading
 Siddall S.E. 1980. A clarification of the genus Perna. Bulletin of Marine Science 30: 858-870
 Gofas, S.; Le Renard, J.; Bouchet, P. (2001). Mollusca, in: Costello, M.J. et al. (Ed.) (2001). European register of marine species: a check-list of the marine species in Europe and a bibliography of guides to their identification. Collection Patrimoines Naturels, 50: pp. 180–213
 Huber M. (2010) Compendium of bivalves. A full-color guide to 3,300 of the world’s marine bivalves. A status on Bivalvia after 250 years of research. Hackenheim: ConchBooks. 901 pp., 1 CD-ROM.

Mytilidae
Bivalve genera